Rocky Mount station, officially the Helen P. Gay Rocky Mount Historic Train Station, is an intermodal transit station in Rocky Mount, North Carolina, United States. Its main building serves as an Amtrak train station, while an adjacent building serves as the bus terminus for the Tar River Transit and as a Greyhound stop. The station is located just south of downtown Rocky Mount and is part of the Rocky Mount Central City Historic District.

History
Rocky Mount station was originally built in 1893 by the Wilmington and Weldon Railroad, in dark red brick Romanesque Revival style. After the Atlantic Coast Line Railroad bought the W&WR, they rebuilt the station between 1911 and 1912, and again in 1916. During the 1960s ACL built a modern structure within the station to store switches and signal equipment before the railroad was merged with the Seaboard Air Line Railroad to form the Seaboard Coast Line Railroad.

In 1995, the  property, which included the station and a former REA Express freight house (c. 1930), was sold to the City of Rocky Mount. Between 1997 and 2000, the station was restored to its early 20th century design features, with additional ADA-compliant platforms and other amenities. The freight house was converted into a bus terminal for the Tar River Transit and Greyhound stop. In 2010, the station was named after Helen P. Gay, a former member of the Rocky Mount City Council who was instrumental in the station's restoration project.

Former ACL office car #303 is on display next to the station. Former ACL "Whopper Hopper" 500000 that had been on display at the station was donated to the North Carolina Transportation Museum in 2018.

Services
The facility is open 24-hours, which includes the ticket office, passenger assistance, baggage service and the waiting area.

The bus terminal, operated by Tar River Transit, provides eight bus routes that operate Monday-Friday at 6:45am–6:45pm and Saturday at 9:15am–5:45pm, closed on Sunday. Greyhound operate, including package express and ticket office, Monday-Friday at 7:30am–1:30pm, 3:30pm–5:30pm and Saturday at 7:30am–12:00pm.

References

External links 

Rocky Mount Station – NC By Train
Rocky Mount Amtrak Station (USA Rail Guide -- Train Web)
Early 20th Century Post Card

Amtrak stations in North Carolina
Rocky Mount, North Carolina
Transportation in Nash County, North Carolina
Bus stations in North Carolina
Rocky Mount, North Carolina
Railway stations in the United States opened in 1893
Historic district contributing properties in North Carolina
National Register of Historic Places in Nash County, North Carolina
Railway stations on the National Register of Historic Places in North Carolina